Berwin Leighton Paisner (BLP) was an international law firm with 14 offices across 10 countries globally, specializing in real estate, finance, litigation and corporate risk, private wealth and tax. 
In 2018, Bryan Cave merged with Berwin Leighton Painser to create Bryan Cave Leighton Paisner LLP, led by Lisa Mayhew and Therese Pritchard.

History

BLP's roots lie in the early twentieth century, when the three original law firms were founded:

 Paisner & Co was established in 1932 by Leslie Paisner and provided general legal advice.
 Lionel Leighton established Leighton & Co in 1942, a firm that advised on litigation and property development.  
 Berwin & Co was founded in 1963 by Stanley Berwin, specialising in corporate finance, mergers and acquisitions, and tax.

In 1970, Leighton & Co and Berwin & Co merged to form Berwin Leighton and moved into Adelaide House, London.

Berwin Leighton Paisner was formed on 1 May 2001 when the two firms merged, comprising a total of nearly 1000 staff, with 122 partners. The new firm's London headquarters continued to be Adelaide House.

Neville Eisenberg was elected managing partner of Berwin Leighton in 1999, and held the same position in BLP until May 2015, when Lisa Mayhew was elected managing partner.

2009 saw the formation of Goltsblat BLP, a 70-strong team that is the only joint venture between an international and local firm in Russia.

In April 2018, Berwin Leighton Paisner merged with the St. Louis, US firm Bryan Cave.

Offices
BLP's headquarters were in London, with 14 other offices across Asia, Europe, Russia and the Middle East.

References

External links
Berwin Leighton Paisner Web site before merging with Cave

Defunct companies based in London
Law firms based in London
Law firms established in 2001
2001 establishments in the United Kingdom
Foreign law firms with offices in Hong Kong